Brunner syndrome is a rare genetic disorder associated with a mutation in the MAOA gene. It is characterized by lower than average IQ (typically about 85), problematic impulsive behavior (such as pyromania, hypersexuality and violence), sleep disorders and mood swings. It was identified in fourteen males from one family in 1993.  It has since been discovered in  additional families.

Signs and symptoms
The following signs and symptoms occur in people with monoamine oxidase A deficiency, which causes Brunner syndrome:
 lack of impulse control
 aggressive or violent outbursts
 ASD or ADHD-like behavioral features
 obsessive behaviors
 difficulties forming friendships
 problems focusing attention
 sleep problems
 trouble falling asleep
 night terrors
 skin flushing
 sweating
 headaches
 diarrhea

Causes
Brunner syndrome is caused by a monoamine oxidase A (MAOA) deficiency, which leads to an excess of monoamines in the brain, such as serotonin, dopamine, and norepinephrine (noradrenaline). In both mice and humans, a mutation was located on the eighth exon of the MAO-A gene, which created a dysfunctional MAO-A gene. The regular function of MAO-A, breaking down monoamines, is disrupted, and monoamines build up within the brain. Mice that lacked a functional MAO-A gene displayed higher levels of aggression, in comparison to mice with a functional MAO-A gene.

Diagnosis
Upon suspicion of Brunner syndrome and after having eliminated other potential suspects via means of differential diagnosis, Brunner syndrome is diagnosed by genetic testing for specific mutations of the MAOA gene. Since the syndrome is so rare, it is usually only suspected and tested for if there are other diagnosed instances of the syndrome in one's direct family.

Treatment
Progesterone & Rauwolfia serpentina (containing Reserpine) are a possible treatment as they both increase MAO-A activity.

History
Brunner Syndrome was described in 1993 by H.G. Brunner and his colleagues upon the discovery of a particular genetic defect in male members of a large Dutch family. Brunner found that all of the male family members with this defect reacted aggressively when angry, fearful, or frustrated. The defect discovered was later found to be a mutation in the gene that codes for monoamine oxidase A (MAOA gene).  Brunner said that an "MAO-A deficiency is associated with a recognizable behavioural phenotype that included disturbed regulation of impulsive aggression".

A letter published by Hebebrand and Klug (1995) criticized Brunner's findings for not using strict DSM criteria.

Society and culture
Brunner's findings have been used to argue that genetics, rather than decision-making processes, can cause criminal activity. Evidence supporting the genetic defense stems from both Brunner's findings and a series of studies on mice. To prove the correlation between MAO-A deficiency and aggression in courts, it is often contended that individuals cannot be held accountable for their genes, and as a result, should not be held responsible for their dispositions and resulting actions.

References

External links 

Rare syndromes
Genetic diseases and disorders
Amino acid metabolism disorders